Otakar Bystřina (23 May 1861 in Věrovany – 18 July 1931 in Ostravice) is pen name for a Czech writer who was a subject of Austria for much of his life.

His real name was Ferdinand Dostál and he worked as lawyer. He is known for collection of humoristic stories from Hanakia (in the Olomouc Region of the Czech Republic) Hanácká legenda (1904, Hanakian Legend) and for biographic novel Súchovská republika (1923, Republic of Súchov).

The second novel is about group of young people living in community dedicated to arts and folkloristics founded around 1882 by Matúš Beňa (1861–1944), a teacher from  Súchová. Many of its members become important figures of culture of Moravia.

References

 Příruční slovník naučný 1962 (encyclopedia by Czechoslovak Academy of Sciences): volume I, page 304.

1861 births
1931 deaths
Austro-Hungarian people
20th-century Czech writers
19th-century Austrian male writers
20th-century Austrian male writers
Czech male writers
People from Olomouc District